Pyramimonas  tetrarhynchus is the type species of  genus Pyramimonas.

References

Pyramimonadophyceae